The Never Ending Summer Tour was the sixth headlining concert tour by American pop rock band OneRepublic, in support of their fifth studio album Human (2021). It began on July 16, 2022, in Bristow, Virginia and concluded on September 14, 2022, in Nashville, Tennessee. They were joined by Needtobreathe and special guests; Brynn Cartelli, Amy Allen, and John K.

Background
OneRepublic announced the tour in February 2022.

Show synopsis
OneRepublic opens the show with their 2016 hit "Kids". The setlist if full of their hits, and multiple cover songs that were written by Tedder ("Halo", "Sucker", "Halo", etc.). When they play "I Ain't Worried" from Top Gun: Maverick, Tom Cruise introduces the song in a pre-recorded message, and clips from the movie are shown. Tedder leads a crowd participation during "Apologize", and at the beginning of the encore, Tedder surprises the crowd from being at the back of the venue, and starts singing "Counting Stars". He makes his way back up to the stage to finish the song and then goes into the show closer, "If I Lose Myself".

Critical reception
Annette Ejofor of the Toronto Star said, "The evening was sweet, emotional and had everyone on their feet. It was a testament to the incredible artistry of Tedder and the entire OneRepublic band." A representative from We Heart Music attended the Kansas City show and said, "Love them or not, you can't deny the hit making of Colorado band OneRepublic and its leader, singer-songwriter Ryan Tedder's ability to consistently write a popular and memorable song, and that was especially on display during the group's hundred-minute headlining performance."

Grace Koennecke of The Post of Athens, Ohio gave the Cuyahoga Falls show a 5/5. She acknowledged their stage presence noting that they haven't lost it despite not touring in many years. And that "OneRepublic still knows how to put on a show and impress fans of all ages with their extensive musical catalog. From old songs to new ones, the band left their mark on Blossom's stage and reminded their audience that their talent is unmatched compared to most bands."

Opening acts
Needtobreathe
Brynn Cartelli 
Jessia 
John K 
Amy Allen

Set list
This setlist is a representation of the Holmdel, New Jersey show on July 17, 2022.

"Kids"
"Good Life" 
"Stop and Stare"
"Rescue Me"
"Run"
"Secrets"
"Love Runs Out"
"Halo" 
"Bleeding Love" / "Burn" / "Rumour Has It" / "Maps" / "Love Somebody" / "Thats What I Want" 
"Sucker" 
"West Coast"
"I Ain't Worried"
"Apologize"
"I Lived"
Encore
"Counting Stars"
"If I Lose Myself"

Tour dates

Band
Ryan Tedder – Lead vocals, keyboards, rhythm guitar, percussion 
Zach Filkins – Lead guitar, viola, backing vocals 
Drew Brown – Rhythm guitar, keyboards, percussion, backing vocals 
Eddie Fisher – Drums, percussion, backing vocals
Brent Kutzle – Bass guitar, cello, backing vocals
Brian Willett – Keyboards, violin, drums, percussion, backing vocals
Ashley Clark – Violin

References

OneRepublic concert tours
2022 concert tours
OneRepublic